Dumitru Pulbere (born 22 February 1952) is a Moldovan jurist. He previously served as judge and President of Moldova's Constitutional Court. He was also elected as Member of the Moldovan Parliament in the late 1990s.

References 

Moldovan judges
Moldovan politicians
1952 births
Living people